Kevin Mérida (born 18 November 1994) is a Guatemalan football player who plays for Marquense.

External links 
 

1994 births
Living people
Guatemalan footballers
Guatemala international footballers
Association football forwards
Deportivo Marquense players